Mkrtich is an Armenian male given name, meaning Baptist in Armenian. The name, refers originally to John the Baptist, known as Surb Hovhannes Mkrtich (Saint-John the Baptist) in Armenian. The widespread family name Mkrtchyan is formed from this given name.

The name is usually romanized directly into English as Mkrtich, but other romanizations are found:
 Mkrtich Khrimian (1820–1907), Catholicos of All Armenians
 Mkrtich Achemian (1838–1917), Constantinople-born Armenian poet.
 Mekertich Portukalian (1848–1921) Armenian teacher

The name is romanized in Turkish as Mıgırdiç:
 Mıgırdiç Margosyan (1938) Turkish-language Armenian author.
 Mıgırdiç Civanyan (1848–1906) Ottoman painter of Armenian descent.

References

Armenian masculine given names